Yüceldi, formerly known as Hamzapınar, is a village in the Hozat District, Tunceli Province, Turkey. The village is populated by Kurds of the Bahtiyar tribe and had a population of 21 in 2021.

The hamlets of Ağırbaşak, Çalıcık, Çat, Kasımlar, Koçmezrası, Özveren and Yenice are attached to the village.

References 

Kurdish settlements in Tunceli Province
Villages in Hozat District